Italy was represented by 36 athletes at the 2007 World Championships in Athletics.

Their 36-strong delegation was Italy's smallest since 1983. Andrew Howe (long jump), Antonietta Di Martino (high jump) and walkers such as Ivano Brugnetti and Alex Schwazer were the main medal hopes. Howe, Di Martino and Schwazer won Italy's two silver and bronze medals.

Medalists

Finalists
Italy national athletics team ranked 6th (with 13 finalists) in the IAAF placing table. Rank obtained by assigning eight points in the first place and so on to the eight finalists.

Results

Men (18)

Women (15)

References

External links
 PLACING TABLE - 11TH IAAF WORLD CHAMPIONSHIPS IN ATHLETICS
 MARATHON WOMEN TEAM - 11TH IAAF WORLD CHAMPIONSHIPS IN ATHLETICS

Nations at the 2007 World Championships in Athletics
World Championships in Athletics
2007